Iván Fliszár (Ivan Flisar, Janoš Flisar) was an obscure Slovene Lutheran teacher in Hungary. He wrote his manuscript prayer-book in Prekmurje Slovene in Bodonci. This may have been the first Lutheran prayer-book in the Prekmurje dialect. In 1797, István Szijjártó published the first printed prayer-book for the Hungarian Slovene Lutherans, Molítvi na ſztári ſzlovenſzki jezik (Prayers in Old Slovene).

Today the manuscript is the property of Simon Sever, the Lutheran priest in Bodonci.

See also 
 List of Slovene writers and poets in Hungary

Slovenian writers and poets in Hungary
People from the Municipality of Puconci